Izet Nanić (4 October 1965 – 5 August 1995) was a Bosnian Army brigade commander during the Bosnian war of independence in Bosnia and Herzegovina.

Family 
An ethnic Bosnian Muslim, Izet Nanić was born to Ibrahim Nanić (1939–2000) and Rasima (born 1945) in the town of Bužim, as second of seven children. His younger brother Nevzet was killed near Bosanska Krupa on 30 June 1992, at the start of the war in Bosnia.

He was married to Safija Remetić, from Varoška Rijeka. Together they had three children; a daughter and two sons.

Career
Until January 1991, Nanić was an officer of the Yugoslav People's Army, when he returned to his home in Bužim due to a broken leg. He was a lieutenant of the Yugoslav Air Force and Antiaircraft Defence in Kragujevac, Serbia. At the beginning of Bosnian War, he joined the Army of the Republic of Bosnia and Herzegovina. Initially he was involved in training and forming new units however after his brother's death he became the commander of the 505th Brigade of the 5th Corps led by Brigadier General Atif Dudaković. He led the command from its creation in 1992 to his death. Izet Nanić was killed during Operation Storm on 5 August 1995 only 5 months before the Dayton Agreement and the end of the Bosnian war.

Legacy

Nanić is seen by the Bosniaks as a legendary commander, as his brigade liberated and brought under Bosniak control, several cities and towns, including Velika Kladuša in Operation Tiger and Sanski Most, Bosanska Krupa, Bosanski Petrovac and Ključ in Operation Sana.

In 1998, Nanić was posthumously awarded the Order of the Golden Lily and the Order of Hero of the Liberation war, the highest honorary title that used to be awarded by the Government of Federation of Bosnia and Herzegovina.

References

1965 births
1995 deaths
People from Bužim
Bosniaks of Bosnia and Herzegovina
Bosnia and Herzegovina Muslims
Bosnia and Herzegovina military personnel killed in action
Military personnel killed in the Bosnian War
Army of the Republic of Bosnia and Herzegovina soldiers
Officers of the Yugoslav People's Army